Société Airlinair, simply known as Airlinair, was a French regional airline based in Rungis, France, operating scheduled regional flights (some of which were on behalf of Air France), and aircraft lease services. The airline has set up bases at Paris-Orly Airport and Lyon-Saint Exupéry Airport. As an Air France regional partner, it also offered flights from Paris-Charles de Gaulle Airport

Airlinair, along with Régional and Airlinair, was fully merged into HOP! in 2017 after a year of negotiations.

History 
The airline was established in 1998 and started operations in May 1999. It was founded by four principal shareholders including Lionel Guérin and is owned by private investors (80.5%) and Brit Air (19.5%).

Since 31 March 2013, all Airlinair flights have been operated under the name HOP!, Air France's regional brand.

Airlinair ceased all flight operations in March 2017 after its merger in HOP!.

Destinations 
As of 30 March 2013, Airlinair operates scheduled flights to the following domestic destinations:

Additionally, the following destinations are served on behalf of Air France:

Fleet
As of March 2017, the Airlinair fleet consists of the following aircraft:

References

External links

Official website (Archive)
Official website  (Archive)

Defunct airlines of France
Airlines established in 1998
Airlines disestablished in 2017
Air France–KLM
French companies established in 1998
French companies disestablished in 2017